Branislav Lečić (born 25 August 1955) is a Serbian actor, director, academic, writer, politician. Known for his versatile portrayals of emotionally vulnerable characters with strong senses of moral justice, Lečić rose to prominence for his role as the rebellious Crni in twelve-episode mini-series Sivi dom (1986).

Since his initial rise to fame, he has established himself as one of the most prolific Serbian actors of all time. He is further known for his role as Royal Army officer Radekić in Silent Gunpowder (1990), poet Aleksa Šantić in biopic television film Moj brat Aleksa (1991), literature professor Teodor Kraj in The Professional (2003) and eccentric captain Tasić in St. George Shoots the Dragon (2008). For his role in Silent Gunpowder, Lečić was awarded a Golden Arena for Best Actor and the Silver St. George Award for Best Actor at the 17th Moscow International Film Festival. His other notable starring film credits include My Uncle's Legacy (1988), Charuga (1991) and Labyrinth (2002).

Lečić has also done extensive stage work, winning many accolades and critical acclaim. He has been employed in the Yugoslav Drama Theatre ensemble as a drama champion, in which he achieved roles as Uncle Vanya and Hamlet. He also directs plays at his own LekArt Theatre and teaches diction and acting at the Faculty of Dramatic Arts in Belgrade.

Politically active, he served as the Minister of Culture and Media from 2001 to 2004.

Acting career

He graduated from the Faculty of Dramatic Arts of the University of Belgrade as an actor in 1978. He made his lead role as the rebel Vanya in 1977's Specijalno vaspitanje. His portrayal was praised by critics, including Slaven Ivanović, Gavrilo Milivojević, Savo Milosavljević, Dragan Bajetić and Goran Jovanović, the latter expressing concern that Lečić would be typecast as a young and liberal rebel. Supporting roles in Hajduk (1980) and Dečko koji obećava (1981), with the lead role in Direktan prenos (1982) showed Lečić's emotional and acting range in a mature, sensible light.

The zenith of his understanding the everyman's delinquent came with the iconic role of Crni in Sivi dom. Starring with acting titans Bata Živojinović and Dragan Nikolić, Lečić became a household name and the role is now considered legendary in the Balkans.

After starring in the series and the film My Uncle's Legacy alongside Fabijan and Filip Šovagović, he then rose to continental fame as Royal Army officer Rade Radekić in Silent Gunpowder, winning him the Golden Arena for Best Actor and the Silver St. George Award for Best Actor at the 17th Moscow International Film Festival. In 1991, he also played poet Aleksa Šantić in biographical television drama Moj brat Aleksa (1991), showing a great sense of empathy for the romantism movement in Europe and later in Bosnia.

In 2002, he starred in Labyrinth, which gained him an Apollo Award at the Novi Sad Culture and Theatre Festival for Outstanding Achievement in a Motion Picture. In 2003, he amassed a leading role as Serbian-language and literature professor Teodor "Teda" Kraj in The Professional (2003), which gained universal critical plaudits, including praise from Jasmina Ahmetagić and Muharem Pervić. He also portrayed captain Tasić in St. George Shoots the Dragon (2008), starring with Lazar Ristovski, Zoran Cvijanović and Bora Todorović.

Lečić appears in Boris Malagurski's documentary film The Weight of Chains (2011). Lečić has also recited poets, narrated audiobooks and recorded dramas for radio. He has also provided voice-work for numerous Serbian-language dubs for animated feature films, including Anger in Inside Out and Spider-Man Noir in Spider-Man: Into the Spider-Verse.

Lečić also provided his vocals and dramatic interpretation for Bubamara, a Serbian-language ballad recorded with Montenegrin singer-songwriter Knez.

He has been very successful in theater, where he received several awards. Lečić one of the founders of several of the most important theater groups that influenced theater of the former Yugoslavia. As a drama champion in both the Belgrade National Theatre and the Yugoslav Drama Theatre, he has performed in the Atelje 212 Theatre, the Croatian National Theatre in Split and the Rector's Palace in Dubrovnik in a wide spectre of comedic and dramatic roles.

Politics and humanitarianism
Besides acting, he also took part in political life, being the leader of "Plišana revolucija" (Plush Revolution), during the reign of Slobodan Milošević. After the victory of the DOS in the 2000 presidential elections, he was named the Minister of culture in the government of the late Zoran Đinđić. After Čedomir Jovanović left Democratic Party (Serbia), Lečić followed, and became one of the founders of LDP. Soon afterwards, he left LDP, and founded the "Moja Srbija" (My Serbia) Movement, taking part in Serbian elections in 2008. In early 2010 he and his party merged into the Christian Democratic Party of Serbia. After the death of its founder and long-term leader Vladan Batić due to prolonged and progressive cancerous illness, Lecic was elected DHSS party president.

An active and liberal humanitarian, he has worked with various charities, including with colleague and friend Marko Živić.

Personal life
He has a son Ivan and daughter Ana from his first marriage to Ivana Vujadinovic, older sister of Bojana Vujadinovic. Later he was married to Nina Radulović, a television presenter with whom he has a son named Lav. They separated in 2016 and officially divorced in 2017.

Rape accusation 
On 22 March 2021, it was revealed that actress Danijela Stajnfeld accused Lečić of raping her in 2012, while on the same day an audio recording of their phone call was leaked to the public of what appears to be a conversation between Lečić and Štajnfeld about the alleged rape. On 13 July 2021, the Public Prosecutor's Office dismissed Štajnfeld's criminal report.

Selected filmography

Film

Television

Serbian dubs

See also
 Cinema of Serbia

References

External links

 
 "Make Up" The Latest Branislav Lecic Film

1955 births
Living people
21st-century Serbian writers
20th-century Serbian writers
20th-century Serbian male actors
21st-century Serbian male actors
Writers from Šabac
Democratic Party (Serbia) politicians
Liberal Democratic Party (Serbia 2005) politicians
Serbian male actors
Serbian male film actors
Serbian male television actors
Serbian male stage actors
Serbian male voice actors
Serbian theatre directors
Serbian television directors
Serbian film directors
Serbian dramatists and playwrights
Serbian actor-politicians
Golden Arena winners
Ljubinka Bobić Award winners
Miloš Žutić Award winners
University of Belgrade Faculty of Dramatic Arts alumni
Zoran Radmilović Award winners
Dr. Branivoj Đorđević Award winners
Croatian Theatre Award winners
Politicians from Šabac